Hanadan may refer to:

 Boys Over Flowers -Japanese manga series
Hanadan, Iran
Hanadan, Yemen